SGX may refer to:
 Singapore Exchange, the securities and derivatives exchange of Singapore
 Sino Gold Mining, Australian mining company (ticker SGX on the Australian Stock Exchange) 
 Songea Airport (IATA airport code), Tanzania
 PowerVR SGX, graphics chipset
 Software Guard Extensions, security extensions for Intel microprocessors